A marry-your-rapist law, marry-the-rapist law, or rape-marriage law is a rule of rape law in a jurisdiction under which a man who commits rape, sexual assault, statutory rape, abduction or other similar act is exonerated if he marries his female victim, or in some jurisdictions at least offers to marry her. The "marry-your-rapist" law is a legal way for the accused to avoid prosecution or punishment.

Although the terms for this phenomenon were only coined in the 2010s, the practice has existed in a number of legal systems in history, and continues to exist in some societies today in various forms. Such laws were common around the world until the 1970s. Since the late 20th century, the remaining laws of this type have been increasingly challenged and repealed in a number of countries. Laws that allow courts to authorise an underage marriage on account of the pregnancy of a female minor when she is below the age of consent, commonly with parental consent, can in practice be a way for a statutory rapist to avoid prosecution for the statutory rape of a child.

The law has been justified as recognition of the cultural value placed upon female virginity at marriage, in which "despoiled girls and women are a source of shame for their families, innocent of wrongdoing though they may be." In some cases, the perpetrator rapes the girl or woman who he wants to marry after she rejected him.

Background 

The overwhelming majority of countries in the world do not have these laws, and, as of 2021, only 20 were believed to still have them.

Many activists and organisations believe that these laws violate the dignity of women and degrade them by allowing them to be traded as possessions between families, imply that rape is not a serious crime, and blame the victim and not the perpetrator. The UN Human Rights Chief, Zeid Ra’ad Al Hussein, said in 2017 that "[punishing] a rape victim by making her marry the perpetrator of a horrible crime against her – there is no place in today’s world for such hideous laws".

Furthermore, those who are against rape-marriage laws do not think victims should be left feeling this way after they have suffered an attack, or feel the need to cover up the assault by marrying the perpetrator. Opponents claim the laws promote impunity for rape, and further victimize rape victims. Thus, the social value of women, as proponents assign to family honour, female chastity and marital status, clashes with opponents' claim of women's right to individual happiness, freedom and sexual autonomy. According to Purna Sen, the policy director for UN Women, these laws were passed to normalise the unlawful sexual activities. They make the sexual relations more respectable in the society because it is considered problematic in a few cultures. Countries who have these laws fall under the category of undeveloped countries and conservative countries.

Mental health problems including PTSD, anxiety disorders, rape trauma syndrome, and depressive disorders are common in rape victims. A Taiwanese study showed that victims feared being vocal about their assault, felt guilty for shaming their families, experienced sexual shame and self blame, and developed negative views of themselves as women.

Advocates for rape-marriage laws argue that they shield the victim and her family from the shame of rape. This is based on the idea that if a girl or woman is raped, it is her own fault and she thus brings her family into disrepute. As a result, many women do not report their sexual assault because they fear this shame, and the possibility of being murdered by a family member. If a woman simply marries her rapist, she preserves her family name and avoids a life of sexual shame. This view exists despite much evidence existing that blaming the victim leads to shame, ridicule, and unnecessary psychological distress.

History

Antiquity 

Traditionally, the marriage of the perpetrator and the victim after the rape was often seen as an appropriate "resolution" of the situation. Among ancient cultures virginity was highly prized, and a woman who had been raped had little chance of marrying. These laws forced the rapist to provide for their victim.

Code of Hammurabi and Middle Assyrian Laws  
The Code of Hammurabi was composed around 1750 BCE (middle chronology), supposedly by king Hammurabi of the First Babylonian Empire. In Hammurabi §156, a woman is engaged to a man, but the man's father has sex with her before they get married. This scenario does not make clear whether the woman consented to having sex with her fiancé's father, and the woman gets to choose which man she marries, so whether or not this is a rape law is contested:

The Middle Assyrian Laws (MAL) were developed between 1450 and 1250 BCE in the Middle Assyrian Empire. The 55th law, MAL 55, stipulated that if a man "took by force and ravished" a young virgin woman who was not married or pledged or asked to be married and living in her father's house, the virgin's father would be allowed to 'ravish' the perpetrator's wife in retaliation and take her as an extra wife. If the perpetrator had no wife, the father could marry his daughter off to the perpetrator for "the (extra) third in silver ... as the value of a virgin", or to another man of the father's choosing for the same price.

Susanne Scholz (2021) noted the similarities between Hammurabi §156, MAL 55, and the Hebrew Bible's Deuteronomy 22:28–29 (composed in the 7th century BCE): in each case, the punishment is financial compensation (in MAL 55 and Deut 22 to the woman's father, in Hammurabi §156 to the woman herself), and the no-longer-virgin woman must to be married off to the perpetrator or another man (in Hammurabi §156, the woman can choose which man she wants to marry; in MAL 55, her father decides; in Deut 22, she must marry the perpetrator).

Hebrew Bible 

A marry-your-rapist provision is believed by some to be found in the Hebrew Bible, Deuteronomy 22:28–29, which according to the New American Standard Bible reads: 

Bible translations interpret the passage differently, with many modern editions translating the term שָׁכַב šākab as "to rape", where older translations usually preferred "to lie (with)". Similarly, most modern translations render תָּפַשׂ tāphaś as "to seize", whereas older translations generally preferred "to lay hold on". Finally, עָנָה anah/inah is almost universally translated as "to humble" in older English translations, but almost always as "to violate" in modern translations. The Good News Translation even rendered the passage as "he forced her to have intercourse with him", and God's Word Translation made it "he raped her". Irrespective of whether or not the woman had given consent to the sexual act, or will give consent to marriage, the man is required to marry her by paying her parents a dowry to settle the matter.

Some Christians believe that the command in Deuteronomy 22:28 does not refer to rape, but to a man enticing a woman to engage in consensual intercourse, as in the passage in Exodus 22:16–17, which also explicitly states the father's right to confirm or refuse the marriage. The Hebrew sometimes rendered as "rapes" here is the verb שָׁכַב šākab, which literally means "to lie (down)" or "to sleep", is sometimes used as a euphemism for "to lie/sleep (with someone)", and when the context adds force, it can mean "to rape", for example in Genesis 35:22 or 2 Samuel 13:14. Adjacent scriptures that speak of forced sexual relations with engaged (versus unengaged) virgins prescribe the death penalty for rapists (Deuteronomy 22:23-27). As apologist Kyle Butte argues, "It is clearly evident from the immediate context of Deuteronomy 22 that rape is not being discussed in verses 28-29," arguing that "verses 25-27 give a clear instance in which rape is being discussed. ... The text says that the man who committed the crime 'shall die' (v. 25)". But not all Christian scholars agree that Deuteronomy 22:28-29 is mere consensual fornication. Eugene H. Merrill (1994) pointed out: "At first glance, the next example, the rape of an unbetrothed girl, might appear to have been a lesser offense than those already described, but this was not the case at all. First, he seized (Heb. tāpaś, "lay hold of") her and then lay down (šākab) with her, a clear case of violent, coercive behavior."

Although commentators such as John Gill (1746–63) and Charles Ellicott (1897) who think Deuteronomy 22:28–29 describes consensual sex often compare it to Exodus 22:16–17 (which almost all scholars agree is a consensual situation), the latter does not specify that the man "violated" her, whereas Deuteronomy 22:29 does. The Hebrew word used here for "violated" is עָנָה anah (or inah), which (depending on the context) can mean "to rape, to force [sexually], to defile, to violate, to ravish, to mistreat, to afflict, to humble/humiliate, to oppress, to subject/submit/subdue, to weaken". Especially when a Hebrew verb is in the pi'el (intensifying) form, this adds force, and in Deuteronomy 22:29 עִנָּ֔הּ ‘in-nāh is in the pi'el. In several other cases in the Hebrew Bible where this word is used to describe a man and a woman interacting, it is usually describing a man forcing a woman to have sex against her will (i.e., rape).

Twelfth century Rabbi Moses Maimonides said the man's use of force would require that he marry his victim and never divorce her:Every maiden expects to be married, her seducer therefore is only ordered to marry her; for he is undoubtedly the fittest husband for her. He will better heal her wound and redeem her character than any other husband. If, however, he is rejected by her or her father, he must give the dowry (Exodus 22:15). If he uses violence he has to submit to the additional punishment, "he may not put her away all his days" (Deuteronomy 22:29).

Middle Ages and early modern period 
In Christian medieval Europe, a man could "rape" a woman, after which she could choose or be pressured to marry her attacker, because she was considered to be a damaged commodity, diminishing her marital prospects. In this specific context, however, the term "rape" could also refer to elopement: a woman would give her consent to being abducted by the man she loved, and thus avoid asking permission from her parents to marry him.

According to Johannah Stiebert, women that were not engaged were not able to consent, so rape became a matter of male superiority. According to the Shulchan Aruch (1565), a codification of Jewish law by Joseph Karo, the girl or her father, depending on age, are given the option of demanding the man marry her in addition to paying a fine of 50 silver beyond any damages physical or mental.

19th century 
Article 357 of the French Penal Code of 1810 (not to be confused with the Napoleonic Code of 1804) contained a provision that if a man had 'abducted' a girl and married her, he could only be prosecuted if the girl's parents or legal guardians arranged to have the marriage annulled first. Although the law does not contain the word 'rape', it has been described as a marry-your-rapist law, and has been held responsible for spreading the phenomenon in the MENA region through French colonisation. Alternatively, similar legislation was spread in the region by the Ottoman Empire, based on Hanafi jurisprudence, which did explicitly mention 'rape' in abduction scenarios. Scholars continue to debate which laws derived from which.

20th and 21st century 
In several Middle Eastern and North African countries, marry-the-rapist laws that were adopted upon achieving independence in the mid-20th century, were carried over from various earlier periods. The origins of these laws are to be traced to a mixture of pre-existing local Arab traditions, Ottoman imperial laws and European (French and British) colonial laws. Traditionally, a woman was considered to be the property of her father. If she was raped, she was considered damaged property "so the rapist must either pay 'compensation' or accept the damaged goods" and marry the victim. To avoid paying the family, the perpetrator often chose to marry the victim, who "had absolutely no choice but to marry the rapist and spend the rest of the life" with him. In this way, some might argue that the victim of the assault had a harsher punishment than her attacker. Currently, India's Penal Code "makes it amply clear that marriage does not act as an absolving factor in case of rape".

Marry-your-rapist laws were common around the world until the 1970s. Since the late 20th century, the remaining laws of this type have been increasingly challenged and repealed in a number of countries.

In 1997, fifteen Latin American countries had laws that exonerated a rapist if he offered to marry the victim and she accepted. These were Argentina, Brazil, Chile, Colombia, Costa Rica, Ecuador, Guatemala, Honduras, Nicaragua, Panama, Peru (since 1924), Paraguay, the Dominican Republic, Uruguay and Venezuela. Costa Rica exonerated a rapist if he expresses an intention to marry the victim, even if she did not accept. The law in Peru was modified in 1991 to absolve all co-defendants in a gang rape case if any one of them married the victim. By 2017, all but four of these countries have definitively repealed these laws. Colombia repealed its law in 1997, Peru and Chile in 1999, Brazil and Uruguay in 2005, Nicaragua and Guatemala in 2006, Costa Rica in 2007, Panama in 2008, Argentina in 2012, Ecuador in 2014. Italy had similar laws until 1981.

In 2017, a World Bank Group report claimed there were 12 countries left with marry-your-rapist laws: Angola, Bahrain, Equatorial Guinea, Eritrea, Iraq, Jordan (repealed in August 2017), Lebanon (repealed July 2017), Libya, Palestine, the Philippines, Syria and Tunisia (repealed in July 2017). A Reuters report, in July of the same year, also listed Algeria, Kuwait and Tajikistan.

Illegal continued existence
The practice of forcing victims of rape to marry their rapists continues in some countries where the laws allowing this have been abolished, or never explicitly existed to begin with. This is the case, for example, in Ethiopia, where marriage by abduction remains common, despite it being illegal under the new 2004 Criminal Code. In Afghanistan, while formally there is no law, "in practice it is not uncommon for a prosecution to be dropped if marriage is offered by the perpetrator or his family." Similar to Afghanistan, Somaliland also did not previously have any laws; however, it still was not uncommon for a rape victim's family to pressure them into marrying the perpetrator.

Campaigns for repeal

Several human rights organizations such as Human Rights Watch, and the United Nations Human Rights High Commission have strongly criticised these laws. These organizations have been working to abolish these laws, and in several cases they have been successful. However, the opposition to the "marry-your-rapist" laws has been less significant than campaigns to criminalize marital rape altogether.

Bahrain 
Article 353 of the Bahrain penal code, dating from 1958, has undergone several amendments since its adoption. It provides that if a perpetrator of rape marries the rape victim before the final sentence is pronounced, the charges will be dropped and criminal proceedings will be suspended. The man is then able to divorce the rape victim.

The law has been criticized by the international community in the early twenty-first century. Parliament voted to abolish it on 31 May 2016, and the Bahraini government started the discussions of abolishing or reforming Article 353, and reached a final decision to repeal the article. However, as at December 2016, the government was still examining the law, and as at July 2017, it was only willing to repeal the marriage option in case of a gang rape. Parliament discussed the bill repealing Article 353 again on 8 May 2018, but it was withdrawn and voting was postponed.

Egypt 
In 1999, Article 291 of the Egypt penal code was repealed by former president Hosni Mubarak by presidential decree. The original article had been adopted in 1904 and inspired by a French provision. The original article allowed any individual who committed sexual assault to avoid penalty if he entered into marriage with the female victim. "In the Egyptian parliamentary debate surrounding the decree to remove the 'marriage loophole', some lawmakers have objected to altering the existing law on the grounds that it provided raped women with their only chance to marry, since after having been raped, no other man would want them. Rape law has, in statute and in practice, privileged the protection of social order over the provision of individual criminal justice."

El Salvador
"In 1996 the Assembly of El Salvador repealed an old law that exonerated a rapist if he offered to marry the victim and she accepted." However, many rapists still had the ability to get away with rape by marrying the victim according to a law made in 1994 known as Article 14, which stated that as a general rule, persons under eighteen years of age can not marry, but established in the second paragraph, that exceptionally they can contract marriage if they are pubescent, they already have a child in common, or if the woman is pregnant. This law was abolished in 2017.

Iraq 
Article 427 of Iraq's penal code, in its current form dating from 1969, states that if the perpetrator lawfully marries the victim, any legal action becomes void. Following parliamentary votes in favour of the abolition of similar laws in Lebanon, Jordan and Tunisia in 2017, women's rights activists made efforts to put the issue on the political agenda during the campaign for the 2018 Iraqi parliamentary election.

Italy 

Article 544 of the Italian Criminal Code considered rape an offence against "public morality", not against an individual person. If the perpetrator married his victim, even if she was a minor, any sexual offence would lapse. Neither the law nor society made a distinction between such premarital rape on the one hand, and consensual elopement (in Sicily commonly called fuitina) on the other. Socially, the victim was put under heavy pressure to agree to marrying her rapist; the alternative was being shunned for the rest of her life as una donna svergognata: a "woman without honour" (literally: a shameless woman). The victim was held responsible for the humiliation of losing her virginity out of wedlock, bringing shame upon herself and her family. If she agreed to marry her attacker, it was thus considered a "reparational marriage" (matrimonio riparatore), that restored her family's honour.

In 1966, Franca Viola was one of the first women to refuse a "reparational marriage" publicly. She was 17 years old when she was raped with the intention of marriage in 1965. The aftermath of her trial ruled that rapists were no longer able to avoid punishment through the marriage of their victims. In 1981, Italy repealed Article 544.

Jordan 
Article 308 of the Jordanian penal code allowed for the perpetrator of sexual assault to avoid persecution and punishment if he married the victim. Only if the marriage lasts under three years does he need to serve his time. Between 2010 and 2013, a total of 159 attackers walked free along the lines of their punishment. Jordan amended article 308 in 2016, barring full pardon in cases of rape but keeping a loophole clause that pardoned perpetrators if they married the victim if she is aged between 15 and 18 and if the assault was regarded as "consensual". Early in 2017, the 10-person Royal Committee for Developing the Judiciary and Enhancing the Rule of Law presented King Abdullah a report recommending the closing of the loophole. The article was abolished in a "historic vote" by the House of Representatives of the Parliament on 1 August 2017. It was then approved by the Senate and ratified by the King. The article had roots in colonialism rather than in Islam. It was remnant of Ottoman codes which had derived it from the French penal code (France only removed a similar provision in 1994).

Lebanon 

Article 522 of the Lebanon Penal Code became a part of the law in the 1940s and stated that rape was a punishable offense, where the attacker could receive up to seven years in prison. However, no criminal prosecution would take place if the perpetrator and their victim got married, and stayed married for a minimum of three years. In 2017, Article 522 of the Lebanon Penal Code, which had been labelled a "rape law" was repealed and Articles 505 and 518 are to be reexamined. After Article 522 was repealed, it was argued by many that the law still lived on through Articles 505 and 518. Article 505 involves the act of sex with a minor, while Article 518 deals with the seduction of a minor accompanied by the promise of marriage.

Malaysia 
Malaysia does not have a rape-marriage law, but nearly did by judicial ruling in 2015–16. The Sessions Court verdict that a man accused of two counts of statutory rape of a 14-year-old girl from Petra Jaya in the Malaysian part of Borneo in October 2015, would escape punishment because he claimed to have married his victim, was overruled by the High Court in Sabah and Sarawak in August 2016 after large-scale protests argued this would set a dangerous precedent for child rapists to escape punishment. Because Malaysia does not have a law against marital rape, it is not uncommon for a rapist to marry their victim after an attack, then claim that the assault happened after they were married. Perpetrators can indeed be punished for acts of sexual violence if they are not married to their victim, but the absence of a law against marital rape provides a loophole, allowing rapists to marry their victims to avoid punishment.

Morocco 

In 2012, Morocco amended Article 475, which provided between one- to five-year prison sentence for a perpetrator that abducted or deceived a minor with no resort to violence or threat, or attempted to do so. The article included a second clause that permitted the withdrawal of a persecution if the perpetrator married the girl or woman. A number of protests and campaigns took place in Morocco prior to the abolition of the Article. The Parliament abolished the law in 2014 as it was considered to be at odds with the 2011 constitution.

Palestine 
Since being annexed by Egypt in 1959, the Gaza Strip has applied Egyptian penal law Articles 290 and 291, although these have been repealed in Egypt itself in 1999. After being annexed by Jordan in 1950, the West Bank has applied the 1960 Jordanian penal law Article 308. It is unclear how often the law was applied in practice. Ikhlas Sufan, director of a Nablus victims of violence shelter, told Human Rights Watch that "between 2011 and 2017 prosecution for rape has been halted in 60 cases – in which the shelter was helping the women – after the alleged rapist agreed to marry the victim. In 15 of these cases the women later divorced these men." After an activist campaign put pressure on the Palestinian Authority, president Mahmoud Abbas eventually signed Law no. 5 of 2018 on 14 March 2018, which repealed article 308 of the 1960 Penal Code enforced in the West Bank. However, because the Gaza Strip is de facto controlled by Hamas, the Egyptian-derived marry-your-rapist law still applies there.

Peru 
After gaining independence in 1821, the first draft of the Peruvian penal code included a section specifically focused on the violence against women. This section encompassed a certain legal code that was meant to protect the "virginity" of women. It was not until 1924 when legislation was passed which stated that rapists were legally able to be exempt from sexual assault charges through a loophole. In cases of rape and to serve as a punishment for the perpetrator, the victim was required to enter into a marriage with their rapist. The notion that marriage could possibly restore a raped woman's honor has been linked to the country's historical, patriarchal, and gender norms. In 1991, this law was modified to absolve co-conspirators in a gang rape case if one of them marries the victim. These laws were enacted upon the belief that it would protect the honor of both the victim and their family.

According to cultural beliefs, instead of losing her virginity because of immoral behaviour, a woman – or her father – retains the ability to claim that the act had taken place due to coercion, thereby saving the victim's personal virtue. Marriage, in turn, would solve the problem of a lost virginity and possible illegitimate child, thus returning honor to the family. Peruvian government started to design and implement policies against domestic violence in 1988 after research showed them to have one of the highest rates of domestic violence against women ranking them 16th in the world. Per research, statistics from several Peruvian institutions, including emergency centers, police reports, and the Ministry for Women and Social Development, approximately 68,818 reports of sexual assaults were received during a ten-year span, which averages to an estimate of 18.8 cases that are reported per day.

On 3 April 1997, The Peruvian Congress voted to repeal the 1924 law that allowed rapists to be exonerated from sexual assault charges if they married their victims. The bill was passed by a vote of 86 to 1. According to congresswoman Beatriz Merino, who sponsored the bill, "This is a great victory for Peruvian women, and also for Peruvian men, since all of us together can celebrate the end of this embarrassment".

Somalia 
Somali law draws its inspiration from civil law, Islamic law and xeer. As of 2018, most cases of rape and sexual assault in Somalia are still settled through xeer, which is the country's native traditional "caste-based dispute resolution system in which traditional male elders dispense justice according to customary laws." Following the customs of xeer, it is common for a "diya" (a fine of money, camels or goats) to be paid by the rapist's family to the rape survivor's family, but in extreme scenarios, the victim is forced to marry her rapist.

Since January 1991, Somalia has been in a state of civil war, without a functioning central government that controls the entire country. The northwestern region of Somaliland unilaterally declared independence in May 1991, while the northeastern region of Puntland unilaterally declared its regional autonomy within Somalia in 1998; both gradually evolved their own legal systems, and made efforts to outlaw the practice of forcing a rape victim to marry her attacker in the late 2010s.

Puntland 
The self-declared autonomous region of Puntland adopted a Sexual Offences Act in 2017, that criminalised all forms of sexual violence against women.

Somaliland 
The unrecognised state of Somaliland, which declared its independence in 1991 but is internationally still considered part of Somalia, did not have any law explicitly allowing rapists to marry their victims in order to go free. However, since the practice is in fact occurring, which a number of politicians have found undesirable, efforts have been undertaken to formally ban it. In January 2018, the government "introduced a bill to outlaw rape and other violent sexual crimes for the first time in its history, which would see rapists imprisoned for up to 30 years". The bill was approved by the lower house of Parliament. The president of Somaliland, Musa Bihi Adbi, hoped that this law will help to eliminate violence against women throughout the country.

Syria 
Syria's laws concerning rape, are that a rapist can escape punishment if the victim agrees to marriage as stated in Article 508 of the penal code, "If there is a contracted marriage between the man who commits rape, sexual abuse, kidnapping, sexual harassment and the victim, then there is no charge or the punishment is stopped”. This law is particularly harmful because many victims are pressured into marrying their rapist due to societal stigma towards the victims. Unlike some other countries, rapists cannot marry victims that are too young to get married, even in cases of pregnancy and, in fact, receive an extended prison sentence.

Tunisia 
In July 2017, Tunisia repealed Article 227 of its Criminal Code which provided a rapist the exemption to avoid all investigations or legal consequences if he married his victim. This repeal of the "marry-your-rapist" law was part of a much larger law in Tunisia to outlaw all violence against women. In a 2010 study by the National Office of Family and Population, 47% of Tunisian women reported being victims of violence. In an event that occurred in 2016, a young man raped his 13-year-old step-sister and married her after she became pregnant. An alleged rapist was able to end his prosecution if he married his victim. The court ruled that this was allowed under Article 277, which has since been removed. The backlash that was received after this ruling contributed to the repeal of the Article in 2017. The new law encompasses all forms of violence or discrimination against women, such as psychological abuse or economic discrimination, and is thus a breakthrough for women's rights in Tunisia. The same law criminalizes marital rape, classifying it as a crime in its own right, and has been commended for its preventative measures to the issue of violence.

Background

Under the Ben Ali regime, women's rights were not given much importance. Women made up only 20% of Tunisia's work force, and they were constrained to low-paying, insecure jobs. Rural Tunisian women also faced deprivation and hardship. Freedoms of expression and association were limited. Heavy restrictions on registration to work for women's organizations and political parties were in place. The overwhelming participation of women during the Tunisian revolution in 2011 made way for transformative changes in Tunisian politics in regards to gender. Tunisia has since been a symbol of advancement of women's rights in the Arab world, being one of the first countries to establish women's voting rights, right to abortion, right to divorce and outlawing polygamy. At the outset of the revolution, women were as active as men in demanding equal access to jobs, education and basic rights and freedoms. Women were heavily involved in the drafting of the new constitution after the revolution, which guarantees equality based on gender in at least one area. Article 21 of the constitution states that "All male and female citizens have the same rights and duties. They are equal before the law without discrimination." Candidate quotas were introduced in Article 16, which guaranteed equal representation of women in politics. Considering the importance given to women's rights, many considered the repeal of the "marry-your-rapist" law a matter of time. When Article 277 was repealed, Bochra Belhaj, a parliament member, passed out celebratory jasmine blossoms. The new law, called Law No. 58 of 2017 of 11 August 2017, went into effect on 1 February 2018.

Uruguay 
Article 116 of the Penal Code and Articles 22 and 23 of the executive order nº 15.032 of Uruguay were repealed in 2006. The articles stated that in crimes of sexual assault, statutory rape, abduction, and disrespect of modesty, the penalty would be extinguished in cases where the assailant and the victim made a matrimonial contract.

United States 

Even though on a Federal Level this law does not exist, a certain phenomenon that resembles marry-your-rapist laws existed in some U.S. states, formerly in Missouri and Florida. This resulted from loopholes in laws that allow for marriage below the age of consent, thus circumventing statutory rape laws.

Missouri 

The age of consent in Missouri is 17. According to a March 2018 article in the Journal Star (Peoria), more than 300 men aged 21 or older married with 15-year-old girls in the state of Missouri between 1999 and 2015. For the men who had premarital sex with the girls they later married, this would constitute statutory rape according to Missouri law, which defines statutory rape as "anyone 21 or older having sex with someone younger than 17 outside of marriage". However, sex is legal within marriage, even with a minor, and Missouri allowed marriage from the age of 15 until August 2018, when a law passed establishing a minimum age of 16 and forbidding marriages between someone under 18 and someone over 21. This created a loophole by which statutory rape could be covered up if the marriage is concluded before the authorities found out sexual intercourse has taken place (especially if it resulted in a pregnancy). This allowed for the suspect to be exempt from prosecution (for example, imprisonment and having to register as a sex offender). Social pressure could be put on the alleged victim to agree to marry her statutory rapist to make him avoid punishment. Moreover, because of Missouri's age loophole, a number of out-of-state couples travelled to Missouri to marry.

Florida 

The age of consent in Florida is 18. However, until March 2018, the state of Florida allowed marriage without any minimum age for a girl if she was pregnant and a judge approved of the marriage. In this manner, the man who impregnated her could avoid being prosecuted for statutory rape. The current law requires anyone seeking marriage to be at least 18 years old, or 17 with the other partner not being more than two years older and the minor having received parental consent; pregnancy is no longer a factor.

Laws by country

See also
Effects and aftermath of rape
Rape culture
Raptio
Types of marriage
Types of rape

Notes

References 

Human rights abuses
Laws regarding rape
Sex laws
Marriage law
Criminal law
Rape by type
Violence against women
Law by country